Randy Frese is a Republican member of the Illinois House of Representatives who represents the 94th district. The 94th district, located in Western Illinois along the Mississippi River, includes all or parts of Adams, Henderson, Hancock and Warren counties. He succeeded Jil Tracy, who chose not to run for re-election to be Kirk Dillard's running mate in the 2014 gubernatorial election. Prior to being elected to the Illinois House of Representatives, he served as the Adams County Circuit Clerk from 2004 until 2012 when he opted to run against John M. Sullivan for State Senate instead of running for re-election.

Frese served as an Illinois co-chair for the John Kasich's 2016 presidential campaign.

As of July 3, 2022, Representative Frese is a member of the following Illinois House committees:

 Appropriations - Human Services Committee (HAPH)
 Financial Impact Subcommittee (HMAC-IMPA)
 Health Care Licenses Committee (HHCL)
 Museums, Arts, & Cultural Enhancement Committee (HMAC)
 Veterans' Affairs Committee (HVET)

References

External links
Illinois General Assembly Profile

Living people
People from Adams County, Illinois
Republican Party members of the Illinois House of Representatives
Western Illinois University alumni
Year of birth missing (living people)
21st-century American politicians